Egyptian Shooting Club is an Egyptian club based in Giza, Egypt with several branches in Dokki, 6th of October City, Katamya, Port Said and Alexandria. The original idea of the club was to provide an area for all Egyptian shooters to express their hobby. Nowadays, It is not only the Egyptian shooters but for every one who wants to play any sport or to develop any hobby, the shooting club will help by providing class pitches and platforms for several sports and hobbies. It was founded in 1938 by a royal decree from King Farouk I of Egypt and then was called The Royal Egyptian Shooting Club. The club has its own football team that is participating in the Egyptian Third Division

External links
 Official Website

Shooting sports organizations